Intercity House is a 10 storey office building at Plymouth railway station, the main rail station in Plymouth, Devon.

Description
Intercity House has 10 stories and is 47.2 m high and is one of the tallest buildings in Plymouth (2018).

History
Work to rebuild the railway station was started by the Great Western Railway in the 1930s but was delayed due to World War II. Work was restarted by British Railways in 1956 to the designs of architects Howard Cavanagh and Ian Campbell as part of the post war reconstruction detailed in A Plan for Plymouth put forward by Sir Patrick Abercrombie at the request of Plymouth City Councillors.

The modernised station, including the tower block of offices, was opened in 1962 by Dr Beeching,

The building was scheduled for a major update in 2014 as part of a ten-year plan to improve the facilities at the station

Proposed demolition
The Heart of South West Local Transport Board published proposals to redevelop Plymouth railway station in 2017. The aim was to provide an improved 'gateway to the city' and would have included the creation of a public square in front of the station. This would have included the demolition of Intercity House.

References

External links
Plymouth.gov.uk
Emporis.com
Skyscraperpage.com

Buildings and structures in Plymouth, Devon
Office buildings completed in 1962